Pass Lake is a small lake located south of Loveland Pass in Summit County, Colorado. Pass Lake drains east via an unnamed stream which flows into North Fork Snake River. The Pass Lake Picnic Area is located by the lake.

References 

Lakes of Colorado
Lakes of Summit County, Colorado